The 1991 Neath by-election was a by-election held on 4 April 1991 for the British House of Commons constituency of Neath in Wales.  It was won by the Labour Party candidate Peter Hain.

Vacancy
The seat had become vacant when the sitting Labour Member of Parliament (MP), Donald Coleman, died on 14 January 1991.  Coleman had already announced his intention to stand down at the next election, so Peter Hain had already been selected to contest the seat.

Result
Peter Hain retained Neath easily for Labour, although there was a 14% swing to Plaid Cymru.

Previous results

See also
Neath (UK Parliament constituency)
List of United Kingdom by-elections

Sources

Times Guide to the House of Commons 1992

By-elections to the Parliament of the United Kingdom in Welsh constituencies
1991 in Wales
1990s elections in Wales
1991 elections in the United Kingdom
West Glamorgan